Tommy Orange (born January 19, 1982) is an American novelist and writer from Oakland, California. His first book, There There (2018), was a finalist for the 2019 Pulitzer Prize and received the 2019 American Book Award.

Orange is a citizen of the Cheyenne and Arapaho Tribes of Oklahoma. He earned a master's degree in Fine Arts from the Institute of American Indian Arts. He was born and raised in the Dimond District Oakland, California, and resides in Oakland, California, with his wife, Kateri, and his son, Felix.

Early life
Orange was born in Oakland, California on January 19, 1982. From age 14 to 24, Orange played roller hockey on a national level. He began playing music at the age of 18. According to a New York Times review, Orange's father was a Native American ceremony leader, while his mother converted for a time to Christianity. After graduating from a community college with a Bachelor of Science in sound arts, Orange worked at a bookstore in San Leandro called Gray Wolf Books, where he developed a passion for reading and thus began writing.

Education 
Orange obtained a bachelor's in audio engineering from a community college and later obtained a Master of Fine Arts from the Institute of American Indian Arts. He now teaches at the IAIA.

Writing career
In addition to his novel, Orange has also published a profile of an average Native American teen (17-year-old Jeffrey Martinez) for Esquire in 2019, revealing what life is like for a Native American in today’s world. Orange has also published short stories in literary magazines, McSweeney’s, Zoetrope: All-Story, and Zyzzyva.

Orange also participated in an episode of The Archive Project at the 2019 Sun Valley Writers' Conference. In the episode, he states that in many ways this book was for his dad and about his dad, whom he described as someone "very secure in their Indianness and doesn’t necessarily teach it to their kids."

Inspiration for There There
Orange has said that his inspiration for There There came in a single moment. He was working at the time in a digital storytelling booth at the Native American Health Center and also at a non-profit founded by the University of California/Berkeley called Story Center. His roles were to record oral stories and to staple and make copies of grants, burning sage, and sending them off with a prayer. This work led him to realize that the stories of urban Natives needed to be heard, especially by other urban Natives so they would be able "to see their own stories reflected in a bigger way." Orange said that "Native people are pretty invisible" and he wanted to tell a story about a community that people knew too little about. He believes that hearing a story similar to one's own is powerful and helps people to feel that they exist, and belong to a real community. Orange has said that feeling out of place makes it harder to be a strong human being. It was his goal to expand the range of what it meant to be Native.

Awards and nominations 
Orange received the John Leonard Prize in 2018, which is awarded for an author’s first book in any genre. In 2019, he received the PEN/Hemingway Award, which is dedicated to first-time authors of full-length fiction books, and the American Book Award, denoting "an outstanding literary achievement".

There There also received nominations for various other recognitions, including the Andrew Carnegie Medal for Excellence in Fiction, the Pulitzer Prize for Fiction, the Audie Award for Multi-voiced Performance, and two from Goodreads Choice Awards: Best Fiction and Best Debut Goodreads Author.

See also
 List of writers from peoples indigenous to the Americas

References

Further reading

External links
 

21st-century Native Americans
Native American novelists
Native American people from the San Francisco Bay Area
Writers from Oakland, California
MacDowell Colony fellows
Institute of American Indian Arts alumni
1982 births
Living people
21st-century American male writers
21st-century American novelists
Novelists from California
Cheyenne and Arapaho Tribes people